The Pancor Corporation Jackhammer is a 12-gauge, blow-forward gas-operated bullpup automatic shotgun designed in 1984 and patented in 1987. Only three working prototypes of the Jackhammer were built. Nonetheless, its distinctive aesthetics and futuristic design have made it a prop in action films, television programs, and video games.

Development
The Jackhammer was designed by John A. Anderson, who formed the company Pancor Industries in New Mexico.  Anderson designed it based on his experiences using pump action shotguns in the Korean War and believed he could create a better shotgun, finding reloading pump action shotguns awkward and time consuming.  Reportedly, several foreign governments expressed interest in the design and even ordered initial production units once ready for delivery.  However, export of the design was held up for production due to United States Department of Defense testing, though the design was eventually rejected.  Testing was done by HP White Labs in destructive tests (destroying two of the three produced).  Those sent to HP White Labs reportedly had  of material removed with increased stamping instead of casting and a different easier method of reloading.  Thus the sole surviving example is not indicative of what would've been an actual production model and is better considered a tool room prototype.  Several dozen non-functioning examples were made from sheet tin, balsa wood, and clay in order to make working tool prototypes. Civilian sales were made impossible by the classification in the US of the Jackhammer as a machine gun and restrictions on machine gun manufacture enacted in 1986. Additionally those foreign governments that did express interest were unwilling to finance development and final production.  With no customers and little interest, Pancor went bankrupt. Supposed overseas orders were subject to United States Department of State approval that was not forthcoming.  The assets of Pancor were sold off, including the few prototypes built.

A toolroom prototype that is in technical firing condition, but is constructed largely with machine screws and requires disassembly to reload, was owned by Movie Gun Services, during which its forearm was replaced with an MP5SD handguard. This example has since been auctioned. Another prototype with more refined construction, though non-functional, was legally registered as a machine gun and has also been seen auctioned.

Design

Though unconventional, the Jackhammer can best be described as a gas-operated revolver. Many parts were constructed of Rynite polymer to reduce weight. Layout was of a bullpup configuration with a 10-round revolving cylinder that fired conventional, 12-gauge shells. The cylinder's method of rotation was very similar to the Webley–Fosbery Automatic Revolver, an operating rod being used to rotate the cylinder, although gas-operated as opposed to the recoil operation of the Webley-Fosbery.

The Jackhammer is capable of semi-automatic and fully automatic fire by way of a thumb safety/selector switch.  At the moment of firing, the front of the shell sealed inside the breech of the barrel much like the Nagant M1895 revolver. Unlike the Nagant, whose cylinder moved forward to form the seal, the barrel of the Jackhammer was driven forward and away from the cylinder by a ring-piston, using gas tapped from the bore.  As the barrel moved forward, the breech cleared the front of the fired cartridge and an operating rod attached to the barrel rotated the cylinder through a "zig-zag" cam arrangement. As the next shell aligned with the bore, the barrel returned under spring pressure back into the front end of the cylinder.  Spent shells were retained in the cylinder, as in a traditional revolver.  The Jackhammer has a charging handle in the forward grip to charge the weapon and a cocking lever in the buttstock to recock the firing mechanism in case of light strikes to the primer.  For reloading, the cylinder was removed from the bottom of its housing and shells were manually extracted. Removing the cylinder required the barrel be moved and secured in the forward position.

Bear Trap anti-personnel device 
Unique to the Jackhammer was the ability to convert a loaded cylinder from the weapon into an anti-personnel device similar to a land mine by the addition of a firing mechanism. The cylinder would be loaded with up to ten 12-gauge shells and the firing mechanism fitted over the bottom section of the cylinder. A pressure plate or plunger can then set to mechanically fire the shells in the cylinder upon pressing or initiate a spring-loaded timer which can be set to trigger firing up to twelve hours later, in one hour intervals. As the cylinder is designed to contain the pressure of firing normally, it can be discharged and reused when used in Bear Trap configuration.

There is some disagreement over whether working models of the Bear Trap were built. According to Ian McCollum of Forgotten Weapons, no working prototypes were produced, however plastic model prototypes were produced and reportedly worked well. However, according to Jane's, development of the Bear Trap was fully completed as of 1994.

See also
Armsel Striker (Street Sweeper)
Atchisson AA-12
Daewoo Precision Industries USAS-12
List of bullpup firearms
List of shotguns
Saiga-12

References

External links

Modern Firearms – Jackhammer
Movie Gun Services – Pancor Jackhammer

Pancor Jackhammer Mk3

Patents

Bullpup shotguns
Trial and research firearms of the United States
Automatic shotguns
Shotguns of the United States